Vehicles is the sixth album by folk guitarist Sandy Bull, released in 1992 through Timeless Recording Society.

Track listing

Personnel 
Sandy Bull – guitar

References 

1992 albums
Sandy Bull albums